Michael Murgatroyd (1925–2004) was an English-born Scottish nationalist political activist.

Born in Huddersfield, Murgatroyd studied at Giggleswick School and served with the Royal Artillery during World War II.  After the war, he worked for Dunlop and Firestone before marrying a Scottish woman, Yvonne, moving to Cockenzie House in Cockenzie.

Yvonne joined the Scottish National Party (SNP), and Michael soon followed, being inspired after hearing a speech by George Leslie.  He took over as treasurer of the SNP in 1970, a time when the party's finances were in a poor state; within his first year in post, he arranged the sale of the party's headquarters, and reduced the salary bill.  He became active in his workplace trade union and tried to gain recognition for it, but was made redundant in 1977, and relocated to Inverness, where he worked driving a taxi.  He remained party treasurer until 1983, when he lost an internal election to Alasdair Morgan.

References

1925 births
2004 deaths
People educated at Giggleswick School
People from Huddersfield
Royal Artillery soldiers
Scottish National Party politicians
British Army personnel of World War II